Reagantown is a hamlet in the Township of East Huntingdon in Westmoreland County, Pennsylvania, United States. It lies along Pennsylvania Route 981, between Smithton and Scottdale Westmoreland County, Pennsylvania Scottdale. Suters, Smiths, Snyders, Lowes, McCurdys, Henkstellers, Reagans and Fosters were the most prominent settlers in the area.

Economy
Traditionally, Reagantown has been a farming and coal mining community.
David Hixson farm lies to the south of Reagantown and contained the Hixson Well which tapped shale and coal in the 19th century under the Fayette Natural Gas Company.

Landmarks
A Presbyterian church was built in 1849, and there is also a Wesleyan chapel, approximately two miles to the south. There is a lane leading south from the hamlet named after this chapel, which leads to it.

Notable person
Charles Rosen (1878–1950), painter

References

Unincorporated communities in Pennsylvania
Unincorporated communities in Westmoreland County, Pennsylvania